The Missionaries of the Sacred Heart of Jesus (MSC;) are a missionary congregation in the Catholic Church. It was founded in 1854 by Servant of God Jules Chevalier (1824–1907) at Issoudun, France, in the Diocese of Bourges.

Jules Chevalier, the founder of the Chevalier Family, had a vision of a new world emerging and he wanted to make known the Gospel message of God's love and care for all men and women and to evoke a response in every human heart. He especially valued love, concern, compassion, understanding, respect and acceptance of every individual. His vision was based on the words of Jesus: I give you a new commandment, love one another. Just as I have loved you, you also must love one another. By this love you have for one another, everyone will know that you are my disciples. [John 13:34 ff]

The motto of the Missionaries of the Sacred Heart is: May the Sacred Heart of Jesus be loved everywhere! The priests, deacons and brothers of the Missionaries of the Sacred Heart are known as MSCs (from the Latin, Missionarii Sacratissimi Cordis). As with most religious congregations in the Catholic Church there is significant involvement on the part of the laity, who may also serve on the missions. The international headquarters is in Rome with numerous communities throughout the world.

History 

Jules Chevalier decided to become a priest at the age of twelve. The origin of the Missionaries of the Sacred Heart is closely connected with the definition of the dogma of the Immaculate Conception of the Blessed Virgin Mary.  The means to lay their foundation being the outcome of special prayers addressed to the Mother of God during the nine days preceding event of 8 December 1854.   The founder had pledged himself to honour the Blessed Virgin in a special manner. Chevalier fulfilled his promise the following year by erecting a shrine dedicated to the honour of Mary under the title of "Our Lady of the Sacred Heart ".

In 1864 he founded the Archconfraternity of the Sacred Heart and sought to have it established in every parish as a means to develop devotion to, and appreciation of, the love that Christ bears all people. In 1867, the Congregation opened its first school in Chezal-Benoît in the Centre Region of France.

In September 1881, at the request of Pope Leo XIII the Congregation sent its first missionaries overseas.  From Barcelona three missionaries set out for Papua New Guinea and  founded the first overseas mission in 1882 near Rabaul on the island of New Britain.  In Papua, the order began a mission at Yule Island in 1885. Bishop Alain de Boismenu, Vicar Apostolic of Papua from 1908 to 1945, established missionary and charitable activities based on the mission at Yule Island. John Ribat, Archbishop of Port Moresby since 2008, was created a cardinal in 2016.

In 1885, a supply base for the Papua New Guinea mission was founded in Sydney, Australia and the Australian Province was established in 1905. Bishop Gsell and other Australian MSCs such as ophthalmologist Fr Frank Flynn were active in missionary work to Australian Aborigines.   In the mid-twentieth century, the imposing monastery at Kensington, New South Wales was the home of the anti-Communist organiser Dr P.J. ('Paddy') Ryan and the popular Catholic controversialist Dr Leslie Rumble, and published the long-running magazine of Catholic culture Annals Australasia, edited for many decades by Fr Paul Stenhouse MSC.

The Congregation continued to grow and established provinces in the Netherlands (1894), the United States (1939), Spain (1946), Ireland (1952), Indonesia (1971) and the Dominican Republic (1986).

Vows 
As members of a religious congregation, Missionaries of the Sacred Heart embrace the evangelical counsels, taking the three traditional religious vows of poverty, chastity and obedience. Poverty means that all possessions are held in common and that no member may accumulate wealth. Chastity means more than abstaining from sexual activity and its purpose is to make the religious totally available for service; it is also a sign that only God can completely fill the human heart. For a member of a religious congregation, obedience is not slavishly doing what one is told by the superior but being attentive to God’s will by prayerfully listening to the voice of the person in charge. Ultimately, these vows are lived out within a community and bolstered by a relationship with God. Consequently:

Becoming a Missionary of the Sacred Heart doesn’t happen over night. Plenty of time and help is given to preparing us for a way of life that is certainly not ordinary!

People interested in exploring if this way is for them usually journey with us for a time of Accompaniment. This is an opportunity to carefully and prayerfully get more of a sense of what we are about and come to know yourself better.

If a person decides to join us he is helped along the many steps of prayer, study, reflection, living and working in our pastoral and missionary settings and sharing our way of life to try it out for size. All this happens before any commitment is made.

The actual process of discernment and formation differs slightly with each province, but the overall scheme is the same.

Religious formation

Discernment 
Young adults aged 18 and over, meet regularly to share their experiences of God and what He may be calling them to become.  During this time the members of the Congregation share what it is like to be a priest, religious brother or sister. The young people are also strongly encouraged to attend Mass as often as possible and to regularly spend time in prayer in order to better discern their vocation.

Live in experience 
In the US this is normally a series of weekends or whole week experiences, designed to help young men who are interested in religious life.
Whilst on these live-in experiences, young people have the opportunity to live in community, to share their faith more deeply and to share with those who are missionaries, both lay and ordained.

In other provinces, this experience is full-time e.g. in the United Kingdom where during this stage a candidate may take classes in philosophy or theology. This is especially so if the person does not possess a university degree. In the Philippines Province, candidates (called ‘Formands’) who have graduated from high school go to live the MSA Formation Centre in Cebu from where they take university classes, a process which lasts some five years. The Filipinos refer to this as the Collegiate.

Aspirancy, postulancy, pre-novitiate
It is normal for a person to have a degree before entering this year.  In the US the aspirant goes to live full-time in an MSC formation house with peers and under the guidance of a formation director.  This period devoted to learning more deeply about what it means to follow Christ as a future member of the Congregation.  In provinces with few postulants the aspirant will normally live in one of the various communities.  In the Philippines there are enough postulants to have a designated house, situated in Valenzuela.

Novitiate 
Once the candidate knows the MSC way of life, he is admitted into the novitiate preparing himself to take the vows of poverty, chastity and obedience.  The novitiate year is crucial, for it is then “...that the novices better understand their divine vocation, and indeed one which is proper to the institute, experience the manner of living of the institute, and form their mind and heart in its spirit, and so that their intention and suitability are tested.” Thus, the novices are given the opportunity for longer periods of prayer and spiritual reading as well as silence in order to reflect on the vocation God is offering and nature of their response. The spiritual development of the novice is of particular focus, especially through spiritual direction. During the novitiate the history and Constitutions of the Congregation are studied in depth.

A simple profession is made at the end of the novitiate and the person officially becomes a member of the Congregation for “By religious profession, members assume the observance of the three evangelical counsels by public vow, are consecrated to God through the ministry of the Church, and are incorporated into the institute with the rights and duties defined by law.”

Post novitiate
Post novitiate is where the newly professed religious deepens his commitment as a member of the Missionaries of the Sacred Heart and decides whether or not to make a lifelong commitment to vowed life. During this period it is normal to pursue a degree in theology; in the US this would be done at Catholic Theological Union, in the Philippines at the MSC’s own theologate in Quezon City, Manila and in the UK at Heythrop College. At the end of this period of formation, which, according to Canon Law, may last no more than six years perpetual profession (final vows) is made and ordination to the diaconate and presbyterate follows for those called to Holy Orders.

Spirit and charism 
The Constitutions of the Congregation state:
The spirit of our Congregation is made of love and kindness, humility and simplicity; but above all, it is a spirit of love for justice and concern for the welfare of all, specially the poorest ones.

For the Congregation the motto ‘May the Sacred Heart of Jesus be everywhere loved’ goes beyond placing statues of the Sacred Heart in churches, First Friday devotions and novenas, important as they are. It means believing that Christ’s love for His people is empowering, healing, all-embracing, liberating and challenging. In practical terms, this means that the Missionaries of the Sacred Heart:
 Are committed to spreading the Gospel of Christ.
 Respond to the needs of all, particularly those who are poor, isolated or marginalised.
 Promote human development and compassion, build and model healthy relationships in the light of Catholic social teachings.
 Encourage, foster and sustain lay leadership in the Church and involvement in their missions and spirituality.

This means that the Missionaries of the Sacred Heart are engaged in a variety of ministries as they respond to the "signs of the times", ever seeking ways in which to bring people to a deeper appreciation of the love that God has for his children, and to do so in "concrete circumstances".

Missions and ministries 
 Australia: Education, parishes, chaplaincies, retreats, justice and peace. The Sacred Heart Church in the Adelaide suburb of Hindmarsh is an MSC church.
 Britain and Ireland: Parishes, schools, retreats, hospital chaplaincy, counselling, migrants and refugees. Missionaries have been sent to Russia, South Africa and Venezuela.
 Philippines: 24 parishes, schools, indigenous people, justice and peace, the urban poor, care for the environment and organising small ecclesial communities. Missionaries have been sent to Brazil, Japan, the Marshall Islands and South Korea.
 South Africa: Parishes, charismatic renewal, healing and deliverance, people with HIV and HIV education, human and spiritual growth and retreats.
 United States: Parishes, Native Americans, those who have fallen away from the Church as well as justice and peace issues. Missionaries have been sent to Colombia,  the Congo, Fiji, India, Papua New Guinea and Senegal.

References

External links 
 MSC Austria
 MSC Australia
 MSC Brazil
 MSC Britain
 MSC Germany
 MSC Ireland
 MSC Philippines
 South Africa
 MSC United States
 MSC Various Links
 Missionaries Of The Sacred Heart Of Jesus - Belgian Province in ODIS - Online Database for Intermediary Structures

 
Catholic missionary orders
Religious organizations established in 1854
Catholic religious institutes established in the 19th century
1854 establishments in France